Geoffrey Perret is an English author who writes about American history. His work focuses primarily upon the political dynamics that influence strategic and tactical military decisions, as well as broader political themes. He has published over thirteen books dealing with a variety of topics such as the US Presidency, including several biographies of iconic Presidents such as John F. Kennedy and Ulysses S. Grant; leading American military commanders such as Douglas MacArthur; and pivotal American military engagements. He also has had one novel, "Executive Privilege" published.

His earlier works use the spelling "Perrett" for his last name.

Education
After serving in the US Army for three years, Perret studied at Long Beach City College and then obtained his undergraduate degree summa cum laude from the University of Southern California in 1967. He was also elected to Phi Beta Kappa. He obtained his postgraduate degree from Harvard University in 1969 and then studied law at the University of California at Berkeley.

Selected publications

References

External links
 Geoffrey Perret Author biography from Random House
 "Campaigning for History" Archived New York Times articles related to the 2008 U.S. Presidential Election
 Publishers Weekly reviews of books by Perret
 
 

Living people
Year of birth missing (living people)
American expatriates in the United Kingdom
Harvard University alumni
American male writers
University of Southern California alumni
University of California, Berkeley alumni